Kadir Akbulut (born 8 May 1960) is a former Turkish footballer and current coach and occasional newspaper columnist. Played at Denizlispor youth division, Akbulut served for Beşiktaş for his entire professional career.

Career

Player

Club
Akbulut had begun playing football in Denizlispor at youth level, until his joining to Beşiktaş in 1980, in which he played for 14 seasons during one of the most successful periods of the team's history. In Beşiktaş years, he played 349 league matches (322 in starting line-up), scoring 4 times, and collected 39 yellow cards, also being a part of undefeated champion squad of 1991-92 season. He also played at European Cups, having 6 caps in UEFA Champions League between 1982 and 1992, and Cup Winners' Cup twice in 1997–98 season.

International
Akbulut played in Turkish national football team in Olympic and senior level, called up the team in total of 4 matches.

Manager
The first coaching experience of Kadir Akbulut was Silivrispor, a Turkish Regional Amateur League team of Silivri district of Istanbul, until his resignation on 3 March 2011. On 1 July 2011, he was hired by Çatalcaspor, another amateur league team located in Istanbul. Managed by Akbulut, Çatalcaspor promoted to 3. Lig at professional stage, for the first time at their history, following 1–0 ended play-off encounter against Edirnespor Gençlik S.K., on 6 May 2014. Akbulut earned a one-year extension for his contract at Çatalcaspor in June 2014.

Honours

 Beşiktaş
 Turkish League: 4 (1985–86, 1989–90, 1990–91, 1991–92)
 Turkish Cup: 3 (1993–94, 1988–89, 1989–90)
 Presidential Cup: 4 (1985–86, 1988–89, 1991–92, 1993–94)
 Chancellor Cup: 1 (1987–88)
 TSYD Cup: 6 (1984, 1985, 1988, 1990, 1991, 1993)

References

External links
 Footballer profile at TFF

1960 births
Living people
Sportspeople from Manisa
Turkish footballers
Turkey international footballers
Turkey under-21 international footballers
Süper Lig players
Beşiktaş J.K. footballers
Denizlispor footballers
Association football fullbacks